L'Assomption Lake (in French: Lac de l'Assomption) is a lake located in the Mont-Tremblant National Park (sector of L'Assomption), in the Municipality of Saint-Guillaume-Nord, in Matawinie Regional County Municipality, in the administrative region of Lanaudière, in Quebec, in Canada.

Leisure 
The lake is surrounded by a cycle path made of rock dust over a distance of seven kilometers.

Toponymy 
The toponym "Lac de L'Assomption" was formalized on December 5, 1968, at the Place name bank of the Commission de toponymie du Québec.

See also 
 List of lakes in Canada

References 

Lakes of Matawinie